Dangkao  is a district (khan) in the southern part of Phnom Penh, Cambodia. The district is subdivided into 13 sangkats and 83 kroms. The district has an area of 197.89 km2. It has a population of 159,772.

Administration 
Dangkao was subdivided into 13 Sangkats and 83 villages.

On January 8, 2019, according to sub-decree 04 អនក្រ.បក, 1 sangkat (Sangkat Prateah Lang) from Khan Dangkao was moved to a new khan, Khan Kamboul.

Education
The Royal University of Agriculture is located in Dangkor District.

Landmarks
Choeung Ek is in Dangkao Section. During the Covid-19 outbreak, the government of Cambodia bought Nokor Tep Women's Hospital which its location is in Khan Dangkao and changed its name to Luong Me Hospital in honor of Her Majesty the Queen-Mother Norodom Monineath Sihanouk in March 2021.

References

Districts of Phnom Penh